Miodrag "Minda" Jovanović (17 January 1922 – 14 December 2009) was a Serbian footballer who was part of the Yugoslav squad at the 1948 Summer Olympics and the 1950 FIFA World Cup. He was born in Belgrade.

References

External links
 Profile at Serbian federation site

1922 births
2009 deaths
Footballers from Belgrade
Serbian footballers
Yugoslav footballers
Yugoslavia international footballers
Association football defenders
Association football midfielders
Red Star Belgrade footballers
OFK Beograd players
FK Partizan players
Yugoslav First League players
1950 FIFA World Cup players
Olympic footballers of Yugoslavia
Olympic silver medalists for Yugoslavia
Footballers at the 1948 Summer Olympics
Serbian football managers
Olympic medalists in football
Medalists at the 1948 Summer Olympics